Isolepis producta is a species of flowering plant in the sedge family. A small aquatic plant seen in southern Australia. The habitat is lagoons, lakes and streams.

References

producta
Flora of New South Wales
Flora of Western Australia
Flora of Victoria (Australia)
Flora of South Australia
Plants described in 1908
Taxa named by Karen Louise Wilson